Celina Ompeshi Kombani (19 June 1959 – 24 September 2015) was a Tanzanian CCM politician and Member of Parliament for the Ulanga East constituency from 2005 to 2015. She also served as Minister of State in the President's Office for Public Service Management.

Kombani died on 24 September 2015 whilst undergoing treatment in India.  She was 56.

References

1959 births
2015 deaths
Chama Cha Mapinduzi MPs
Tanzanian MPs 2010–2015
Government ministers of Tanzania
Tabora Girls Secondary School alumni
Mzumbe University alumni